Araca can refer to:

Araca, a town in Bolivia
Arača, a ruins of a Romanesque monastery in Serbia
Araca group, a theatrical production company